In the Manner of Sherlock Holmes (French:  À la manière de Sherlock Holmes) is a 1956 French crime film directed by Henri Lepage and starring Henri Vilbert, Claude Sylvain and Michel Ardan.

The film's sets were designed by the art director Raymond Nègre.

Synopsis
A Parisian businessman travelling in Rouen is implicated in a case of theft and murder.

Cast
 Henri Vilbert as Henri Lombard
 Claude Sylvain as Viviane Deroches
 Michel Ardan as Louis Gamay
 Robert Dalban as Commissaire Sanois
 Jean-Pierre Kérien as Marval
 Jacques Dynam as Assistant
 Georgette Anys as La femme de ménage
 Charles Lemontier as Leblond
 Paul Lambret as Chan
 Charles Rigoulot as  l'inspecteur Barbier

References

Bibliography 
Palmer, Tim. Tales of the Underworld: Jean-Pierre Melville and the 1950s French Cinema. University of Wisconsin-Madison, 2003.

External links 
 

1956 films
1956 crime films
French crime films
1950s French-language films
Films directed by Henri Lepage
Films set in Normandy
1950s French films
French black-and-white films